The Clydebank Blitz were a pair of air raids conducted by the Luftwaffe on the shipbuilding and munition-making town of Clydebank in Scotland. The bombings took place in March 1941.

The air raids were part of a bombing program known today as The Blitz.

The air raids
As a result of the raids on the nights of 13 and 14 March 1941, the town was largely destroyed and it suffered the worst destruction and civilian loss of life in all of Scotland. 1,200 people died, 1,000 people were seriously injured, and hundreds more were injured by blast debris. Over the course of the two nights, a total of 439 Luftwaffe bombers dropped in excess of 1,650 incendiary containers and 272 tonnes of bombs. Out of approximately 12,000 houses, only eight remained undamaged — with 4,000 completely destroyed and 4,500 severely damaged. Over 35,000 people were made homeless.

Clydebank's production of ships and munitions for the Allies made it a target (similar to the Barrow Blitz). Major targets included the John Brown & Company shipyard, ROF Dalmuir and the Singer Corporation factory. RAF fighters managed to shoot down two aircraft during the raid, but none were brought down by anti-aircraft fire.

In his book Luftwaffe over Scotland: A History of German Air Attacks on Scotland, 1939-45, amateur historian Les Taylor characterised the Clydebank Blitz as "the most cataclysmic event" in wartime Scotland. He claims that while the raid on 13 March was not intended as a terror attack, it caused extensive damage because there was a lot of housing near the specific targets but the bombings the following night were indeed a terror attack as it "was intended to crack morale and force the people to call for an end to the war. However, it had quite the opposite effect, strengthening resolve for the war in Scotland."

Effectiveness of the raids
To the immediate west of the town was situated Clydeside's main Admiralty Oil Storage facility, covering . Luftwaffe target maps categorised this area as the primary target. Post-raid surveys counted 96 bomb craters. 11 tanks were destroyed and 7 were severely damaged. The resulting inferno blazed for over four weeks. Clydebank, to the immediate East, suffered badly as a result of being in close proximity. Target discrimination was made difficult by the close mix of industry and housing resulting in a catastrophic housing loss.

Many industrial targets were severely damaged. Singer's wood yard was destroyed and Singer's main building was badly damaged. Rothesay Dock and John Browns Shipyards suffered severe incendiary damage. William Beardmore & Co lost furnaces and related industrial infrastructure. Schools, churches and built-up town areas became victims of incendiaries.

War memorials
The main Blitz memorial is located in Dalnottar Cemetery above Clydebank. It is composed of a substantial granite memorial with bronze cast plates at its base designed by the artist Tom McKendrick. The castings name the 528 casualties. The memorial sits over the remains of Clydebank's unclaimed dead.

An additional memorial is dedicated to the crew of a Polish destroyer, which helped defend the town from the docks of the John Brown & Company shipyard. It is located directly opposite from the Town Hall, which has itself a shrine dedicated to those in Clydebank who died during World War I and World War II. There is another war memorial on Graham Avenue. A recording made in May 1941 by bombed-out civilian Tom Wright features on The Blitz, an archive audiobook CD issued in 2007.

References

Bibliography
Macleod, John: "River of Fire: The Clydebank Blitz", Birlinn Ltd, 2010, 256 pages. .
Macphail, I.M.M.: "The Clydebank Blitz", West Dunbartonshire Libraries & Museums, 2007, 118 pages. 
McCloskey, Keith. From the Blitz to University Flying: Essays on Glasgow's Aviation History. Published on Amazon., 2019. .
Taylor Les: "Luftwaffe over Scotland: a history of German air attacks on Scotland, 1939-45",  Whittles Publishing, 2010, 160 pages.

External links
Post-Blitz Clydebank — a documentary about Clydebank, Scotland from 1947 to 1952
 Full list of casualties, bomb map, list and bomb location, and blitz interviews
The Blitz audiobook featuring Tom Wright

1941 in Scotland
The Blitz
History of West Dunbartonshire
Clydebank
20th century in West Dunbartonshire
Scotland in World War II